The 1995–96 season was Manchester United's fourth season in the Premier League, and their 21st consecutive season in the top division of English football. United finished the season by becoming the first English team to win the Double (league title and FA Cup) twice. Their triumph was made all the more remarkable by the fact that Alex Ferguson had sold experienced players Paul Ince, Mark Hughes and Andrei Kanchelskis before the start of the season, and not made any major signings. Instead, he had drafted in young players like Nicky Butt, David Beckham, Paul Scholes and the Neville brothers, Gary and Phil.

Eric Cantona returned from his eight-month suspension at the beginning of October, and finished the season as the club's top scorer with 19 goals in all competitions, the last one being the winner against Liverpool in the FA Cup Final. He also picked up a Premier League winner's medal and the FWA Player of the Year award. The Premier League title was sealed on the final day of the season with a 3–0 win at Bryan Robson's Middlesbrough.

Season overview
Having started the season without a major summer signing, the critics were ready to pounce on United, and made no apologies for writing United's chances of success off as they lost their first game of the season 3–1 at Aston Villa, a side who by contrast had spent heavily on players in recent months after a difficult period of transition. United hit back by winning their next five league games and were soon second to Newcastle United, spearheaded by multimillion-pound new signings Les Ferdinand and David Ginola. They actually went top of the league after a goalless draw at Sheffield Wednesday towards the end of September, only for the Tynesiders to return to the top of the table soon after. Then came Cantona's comeback on 1 October, when he scored a penalty to equalise and hold Liverpool to a 2–2 draw at Old Trafford.

The autumn saw United suffer first-hurdle exits to York City in the League Cup and Rotor Volgograd in the UEFA Cup, although United did preserve their 39-year home unbeaten record in European competitions thanks to a late equaliser by goalkeeper Peter Schmeichel in the second leg of the European tie. On the domestic scene, the 3–0 defeat they suffered at home to the Division Two strugglers in the first leg of the League Cup second round was their only home defeat of the season. A 3–1 win in the return leg at Bootham Crescent was not enough and United suffered a humiliating exit, although at least these disappointments meant that United only had the league to concentrate on until after Christmas, unlike some of their fellow title contenders.

United remained unbeaten throughout October and November, although they remained second behind Newcastle in the league. Then came a five match winless run which saw them 10 points behind Newcastle by Christmas. On 27 December, they hosted Newcastle at Old Trafford and won 2–0, with one of the goals coming from Andy Cole, the former Newcastle goal machine who had arrived at Old Trafford the previous winter, and the gap was down to seven points. A 2–1 win over QPR briefly cut the gap to four points. Making his debut in that game was French defender William Prunier signed on a trial contract following an injury to Gary Pallister. Prunier also appeared in the United team at Tottenham on New Year's Day, but United crashed 4–1 at White Hart Lane and Prunier was soon gone. United's title hopes appeared to be fading, and when they went 2–1 down at Old Trafford in the FA Cup third round to Division One promotion challengers Sunderland, it looked as though this season could prove to be another trophyless season for United. But an Eric Cantona equaliser with 10 minutes remaining forced a replay at Roker Park, where Sunderland once again took the lead before United finally won 2–1. There was more frustration in the league as United's second league game of 1996 saw them draw 0–0 at home to Aston Villa. The last league game of the month was won 1–0 at West Ham, and then came an easy 3–0 win over Reading in the FA Cup fourth round at Elm Park.

United narrowed the gap between themselves and leaders Newcastle once again in February, winning all four of their league games that month. A 4–2 away win over Wimbledon was followed by a home clash with Blackburn, who were mid-table in a disappointing defence of their league title. Lee Sharpe was on the scoresheet as United won 1–0, and their next game was a 2–0 home win over Everton. The month was completed with a 6–0 away win over Bolton, which pushed their hosts closer to eventual relegation but also gave United's goal difference a major boost as well as putting United just four points behind Newcastle. United had also defeated Manchester City 2–1 in the FA Cup fifth round at Old Trafford, and so a unique second double was suddenly looking like a very serious possibility.

March began with a visit to Tyneside, for what was billed by many as the title decider. United kept their hosts, who had yet to drop points at home, at bay in the first half of the game, thanks largely to the goalkeeping heroics of Schmeichel. The deadlock was finally broken in the second half with a Cantona goal, and the gap was now down to a single point. United briefly went top the following weekend with a 1–1 draw at struggling QPR, and after another Cantona goal gave them a 1–0 home win over Arsenal on 20 March, United went top of the table and stayed there for the rest of the season.

The title race went down to the wire, but United went into the last game of the season knowing that a draw at Middlesbrough would give them the title, and Newcastle needed to beat Tottenham to have any chance of depriving them of title glory. A 3–0 victory gave United the title, and the following Saturday they triumphed 1–0 over Liverpool in the FA Cup final, with a late goal from Cantona (already voted FWA Player of the Year) making them the first team to win the double twice.

Veteran defenders Steve Bruce and Paul Parker moved on at the end of the season, as did goalkeeper Tony Coton, who had only joined the club in January and never played a first team game. As the season drew to a close, speculation mounted that United would sign a world-class striker – possibly Alan Shearer – to partner Eric Cantona in the bid to bring the European Cup to Old Trafford.

The season also produced one of the most infamous moments in football shirt history, when United changed their kits at half-time during their away defeat to Southampton, with Alex Ferguson stating that it was because he felt the kit left players unable to spot each other on the pitch, as well as the fact that United had not won a single of their five games played wearing the kit.

Pre-season and friendlies

FA Premier League

Manchester United opened the 1995–96 season with a 3–1 defeat away to Aston Villa, after which their young team was written off by all the media, most famously by Alan Hansen who claimed "you'll never win anything with kids". The younger players were partnered with veterans like Steve Bruce, Roy Keane and Peter Schmeichel, and began to look a convincing outfit, particularly after a 2–1 win away to defending champions Blackburn Rovers. A 1–0 defeat at Arsenal was only their second league defeat of the campaign, but in the run-up to Christmas they endured a five-match winless run which left Newcastle United looking uncatchable with a 10-point lead. A 2–0 home win over the Tynesiders on 27 December cut the gap to seven points, but it widened again on New Year's Day when United were crushed 4–1 at Tottenham Hotspur.

United then went on a strong run of form which saw the gap between themselves and Newcastle cut to four points by the end of February, and on 4 March they won 1–0 at Newcastle to cut the gap to a single point. They went top of the league soon afterwards and went into the final game of the season at Middlesbrough only needing a point to put the title beyond all doubt. United sealed their third league title in four seasons by beating the Teessiders 3–0.

FA Cup

United won the FA Cup by beating Liverpool 1–0 in the final at Wembley Stadium, with the only goal coming from Eric Cantona in the 85th minute. On the way to the final, Manchester United defeated Sunderland, Reading, Manchester City, Southampton and Chelsea.

League Cup

As in the previous seasons, United rested many of their first-team players in the League Cup, instead using the competition to provide first team experience to the club's younger players and reserves. This proved to be a bad move, as the Red Devils fell at the first hurdle, losing in the Second Round to Second Division side York City, 4–3 on aggregate.

UEFA Cup

Squad statistics

Transfers
United's first departure of the 1995–96 season was Matthew Barrass, who joined San Diego Nomads on 1 July. A day later, David Gardner was released, Paul Heckingbottom joined Sunderland, Patrick Lee joined Middlesbrough, and Paul Lyons joined Rochdale. Richard Irving signed for Nottingham Forest on 19 July, while a week later, Ashley Westwood departed for Crewe Alexandra. Gary Walsh signed for Middlesbrough on 11 August, Andrei Kanchelskis joined Everton, while in late September, Elliott Dickman joined Sunderland, and Stephen Hall was released. John Hudson was released on 5 November.

United's only summer arrival of the 1995–96 season was Nick Culkin, who signed from York City on 25 September.

United's only winter departure was Matthew Wicks, who joined Arsenal on a free transfer on 23 January. Former captain Steve Bruce left for Birmingham City on 22 May, while on 30 June, Dessie Baker, Daniel Hall, Paul Parker, and Phillip Whittam left the club.

United's only winter arrival was Tony Coton, who signed from United's rivals Manchester City on 31 January. Raimond van der Gouw joined United from Vitesse Arnhem on 25 June 1996.

In

Out

Loan in

Loan out

References

Manchester United F.C. seasons
Manchester United
1996